Michèle André (born 6 February 1947) is a French politician and member of the Socialist Party. Director of a public medico-social establishment, she was a Senator for the Puy-de-Dôme department and president of the  until October 2017.

Biography 
Michèle André was a Secretary of State, in charge of women's rights and the equality of opportunity between men and women, in the 2nd government of Michel Rocard from 23 June 1988 to 15 May 1991.

She was a Vice-President in the Senate until 7 October 2008, the renewal date for the Senate executive office. In the role, André was a member of the Constitutional laws, legislation, universal suffrage, regulations and general administration committee.

André was a Socialist Senator for the Puy-de-Dôme department from 23 September 2001 to 1 October 2017. She was also a member of the Assemblée parlementaire de la Francophonie and president of the France-Croatia inter-parliamentary friendship group and Senate delegation for women's rights and the equality of opportunity between men and women.

Other involvements 

 General councillor of Puy-de-Dôme (Canton of Clermont-Ferrand-Nord-Ouest) from 1989 to 1992 and from 1998 to 2015. 
 President of the Association for the Management of Senators' Assistants (AGAS).
 Member of the Masonic order , Vice-President of the fraternity of parliamentarians in the Senate.

References

1947 births
Living people
Socialist Party (France) politicians
French Senators of the Fifth Republic
Women members of the Senate (France)
Women government ministers of France
Senators of Puy-de-Dôme